The Northern Luzon languages (also  known as the Cordilleran languages) are one of the few established large groups within Philippine languages. These are mostly located in and around the Cordillera Central of northern Luzon in the Philippines. Among its major languages are Ilokano, Pangasinan and Ibanag.

Internal classification
Lawrence Reid (2018) divides the over thirty Northern Luzon languages into five branches: the Northeastern Luzon, Cagayan Valley and Meso-Cordilleran subgroups, further Ilokano and Arta as group-level isolate branches.

Ilocano
Arta
Dicamay Agta † (unclassified)
Cagayan Valley
Isnag
1. Ibanagic
Atta
Ibanag
Itawis
Yogad
2. Gaddang-Cagayan
Central Cagayan Agta
Gaddang
Ga'dang
Northeastern Luzon
Dupaningan Agta
(core)
Dinapigue Agta
Casiguran Agta, Nagtipunan Agta
Pahanan Agta, Paranan
Meso-Cordilleran
1. Northern Alta
2. Southern Alta
3. South-Central Cordilleran
Central Cordilleran
Isinai
North Central Cordilleran
Kalinga-Itneg
Itneg
Kalinga
Nuclear Cordilleran
Ifugao
Balangao
Bontok-Kankanaey
Bontok-Finallig
Kankanaey
Southern Cordilleran
Bugkalot
West Southern Cordilleran
Pangasinan
Nuclear Southern Cordilleran
Ibaloi
Iwaak
Kallahan
Karao

Reconstruction

Phonology
Reid (2006) has reconstructed the Proto-Northern Luzon sound system as follows, with phonemic stress:

The sound inventory of Proto-Northern Luzon shows no innovations from Proto-Malayo-Polynesian that would set it apart from other Philippine languages. There are however two phonological innovations that characterize the Northern Luzon languages:
Loss of final *ʔ (< *q)
Metathesis of *s and *t, e.g. Proto-Northern Luzon  < Proto-Malayo-Polynesian  'weep',  <  'hundred'.

Vocabulary
Lexical innovations only found in Northern Luzon languages include:  'feather, body hair',  'squeeze',  'swell',  'earthquake',  'stand',  'buttocks'. Semantic shifts are observed e.g. in  'give' (cf. Proto-Philippine  'escort') and  'wild pig' (cf. Proto-Philippine  'flesh').

Footnotes

Ethnic groups

See also
Northeastern Luzon languages

References

 
Philippine languages